The Department of Resources and Energy was an Australian government department that existed between March 1983 and July 1987.

History
The Department was one of three new Departments established by the Hawke Government in March 1983, to ensure the priorities of the Labor Government could be given effect to readily following the federal election of that month.

The Department was dissolved in July 1987 as part of a large overhaul of the Public Service that reduced the number of departments from 28 to 17.

Scope
Information about the department's functions and/or government funding allocation could be found in the Administrative Arrangements Orders, the annual Portfolio Budget Statements and in the Department's annual reports.

At its creation, the Department was responsible for the following:
National energy policy, including planning and research into coal, oil and gas, uranium, solar energy and other forms of energy 
Radioactive waste management. 
Minerals exploration and resource assessment. 
Water resources, soil conservation, and electricity. 
Geodesy and mapping. 
Decentralisation and urban planning and development. 
Local government.

Structure
The Department was a Commonwealth Public Service department, staffed by officials who were responsible to the Minister for Resources and Energy, Peter Walsh
(from 1983 to 1984) and then Gareth Evans (from 1984). The Secretary of the Department was A.J. Woods (until 1986) and then G. Evans (from 1986).

References

Ministries established in 1983
Resources and Energy
1983 establishments in Australia
1987 disestablishments in Australia